Jessica Gill is a camogie player. She won a camogie All Star award in 2008 and played in the 2008 All Ireland final and 2009 All Ireland club final.  She was named the 2007 Young Player of the Year.

References

External links
 Official Camogie Website
 Galway Camogie website
 of 2009 championship in On The Ball Official Camogie Magazine
 https://web.archive.org/web/20091228032101/http://www.rte.ie/sport/gaa/championship/gaa_fixtures_camogie_oduffycup.html Fixtures and results] for the 2009 O'Duffy Cup
 All-Ireland Senior Camogie Championship: Roll of Honour
 Video highlights from Galway's 2009 championship matches against  Kilkenny and  Wexford.
 Video highlights of 2009 championship Part One and part two
 Reports of 2008 All Ireland final in  Independent, Irish Times  Examiner, Reaction in Examiner
 Video highlights of 2008 championship Part One,  Part Two and Part three
 Video of 2008 All Ireland finals preview
 Video of 2008 All Ireland semi-final Wexford v Galway

Living people
Galway camogie players
Year of birth missing (living people)